The kings of Munster, ruled from the establishment of Munster during the Irish Iron Age, until the High Middle Ages. According to Gaelic traditional history, laid out in works such as the Book of Invasions, the earliest king of Munster was Bodb Derg of the Tuatha Dé Danann. From the Gaelic peoples, an Érainn kindred known as the Dáirine (also known as Corcu Loígde and represented today in seniority by the Ó hEidirsceoil), provided several early monarchs including Cú Roí. In a process in the Cath Maige Mucrama, the Érainn would lose out in the 2nd century AD to the Deirgtine, ancestors of the Eóganachta. Munster during this period was classified as part of Leath Moga, or the southern-half, while other parts of Ireland were ruled mostly by the Connachta.

After losing Osraige to the east, Cashel was established as the capital of Munster by the Eóganachta. This kindred ruled without interruption until the 10th century. Although the High Kingship of Ireland was dominated during this time by the Uí Néill, the Eóganachta of Munster did provide Cathal mac Finguine and Fedelmid mac Crimthainn as serious contenders. This great tribe was broken down into different septs or branches, the most successful in terms of royalty were the Eóganacht Chaisil (represented by the Ó Súilleabháin and Mac Cárthaigh), Eóganacht Glendamnach (represented by the Ó Caoimh) and Eóganacht Áine (represented by the Ó Ciarmhaic).

Their hold was loosened by the rise of Brian Bóruma of the Dál gCais, who established the Ó Briain as kings of Munster. As well as this Munster had to contend with the Normans. Finally, the kingdom ended as it was split into Thomond, Desmond and Ormond. The former two came to an end during the 16th century with birth of the Tudor Kingdom of Ireland, with former rulers joining the Peerage of Ireland. There were a number of Gaelic attempts to reassert their power in Munster, such as that of Fínghin Mac Cárthaigh and Domhnall Cam Ó Súilleabháin Bhéara, but these were not successful.

Ancient and legendary Kings of Munster
 Bodb Derg, king of the Sid Mumu, and later king of the Tuatha Dé Danann, succeeding The Dagda
 Conmáel, first Milesian king based in Munster, and also High King of Ireland
 Eochaid Faebar Glas, his son and High King of Ireland, possibly based in Munster also
 Eochu Mumu, his grandson and High King of Ireland, and after whom Munster is said to be named
 Énna Airgdech, his son and High King of Ireland
 Eochu Apthach, a possibly fictitious very early High King of Ireland from the Corcu Loídge, but misplaced chronologically in any event
 Íar mac Degad, ancestor of the Érainn, or those specifically named "Descendants of Iar mac Degad"
 Eterscél Mór, his son and High King of Ireland
 Conaire Mór, his son in most sources, and one of the most celebrated High Kings of Ireland
 Conaire Cóem, High King of Ireland and great-great grandson of Conaire Mór
 Note: both are ancestors of the Síl Conairi
 Dáire mac Degad, ancestor of the Dáirine
 Cú Roí mac Dáire, Munster king and/or deity known from the Ulster Cycle
 Note: possibly the actual first of the Dáirine, for many generations the dominant military power from Munster, finally falling during the 6th century AD
 Dáire Doimthech, if actually different from Dáire mac Degad, and thus ancestor of the "other" Dáirine
 Lugaid Loígde, his son, if actually different from Lugaid Mac Con below
 Eochaid Étgudach, another son of Dáire Doimthech, but misplaced chronologically
 Nia Segamain, an actual ancestor or group of them of the Clanna Dergthened and thus the Eóganachta
 Note (critical): actually attested in Munster ogham inscriptions, and in some pedigrees descendant(s) of the "other" Dáirine above
 Note (in addition): probably wildly misplaced chronologically but considered of high status enough to make it to the legendary High King of Ireland lists
 Mug Nuadat, king in late sagas of Leth Mogha, or Mug's Half, meaning Southern Ireland
 Note: belonged to the Deirgtine, but may be a mythological figure (Nuada)
 Ailill Aulom, Mug's son, aka Olioll Ólum, associated with the goddess Áine
 Note: also called a druid in a very early source 
 Lugaid Mac Con, was High King of Ireland, and Ailill's foster-son
 Note: ancestor of the Corcu Loígde, principal later (3rd century and after) Munster sept of the Dáirine
 Éogan Mór, Ailill's son, from whom the Eóganachta took their name
 Note: the Eóganachta were actually founded by Conall Corc, great-great grandson of Eógan Mór
 Fiachu Muillethan, son of Éogan Mór
 Note: a king of the Deirgtine of curious career, supported by Mug Ruith
 Ailill Flann Bec, son of Fiachu Muillethan
 Note: almost nothing is known of this figure, except that he was adopted by and succeeded his elder brother, Ailill Flann Mór
 Dáire Cerbba, born in Brega of unclear parentage, usually (and obviously) assumed Dáirine but later written a son of Ailill Flann Bec 
 Note: called King of Medon Mairtine, once a very early capital of Munster, in one source, and progenitor of yet "another" sept of the Dáirine
 Óengus Bolg, an important late king of the Dáirine and (near) final sovereign ancestor (of Munster) from the Corcu Loígde
 Note: features in early stories of Conall Corc, and is an ancestor of the Cashel Eóganachta septs, the "Inner Circle", through his daughter Aimend
 Crimthann mac Fidaig, was High King of Ireland and of territories overseas, and brother of the Queen and Goddess Mongfind
 Note: considered Eóganacht (if vehemently opposed by them) in some dynastic traditions, but possibly a grandson of Dáire Cerbba (other sources)
 Bressal mac Ailello Thassaig, a King of Munster (one source only) from the early Uí Liatháin
 Note: Angias, his sister, was the Queen of Lóegaire mac Néill, High King of Ireland and Emperor of the Barbarians

Historical Kings of Cashel, Iarmuman, and Munster
There were not verifiable Eóganacht overkings of (all or most of) Munster until the early 7th century, after the Corcu Loígde had fallen entirely from power, some time after losing their grip on the Kingdom of Osraige and the support of the Muscraige and others. Thus the earlier kings below are best described as Kings of Cashel, Kings of Iarmuman, or Kings of the Eóganachta. Faílbe Flann mac Áedo Duib was the first Eóganacht to powerfully project outside Munster, but his Iarmuman relations were a significant rival of Cashel in his time, and not enough is known of many of his successors before Cathal mac Finguine, although the fragmentary nature of the surviving sources can to an extent be blamed.

At this time also flourished the semi-independent Uí Fidgenti and Uí Liatháin, a pair of shadowy sister kingdoms whose official origins appear to have been adjusted in the 8th century in a semi-successful (if ambiguously necessary) attempt to integrate them into the Eóganachta political structure and genealogical scheme. Effective relations and an alliance were achieved with the Uí Fidgenti, to the credit of Eóganacht strength, wealth and finesse, but for unknown reasons the Uí Liatháin remained effective outsiders except to Eóganacht Glendamnach.

Of the Eóganachta, unless noted.

Eóganacht Chaisil, –500

|-
| Corc mac Luigthig –||  || Son of Luigthech mac Ailill Flann Bec ||Aimendseveral children|| unknown
|-
| Nad Froích mac Cuirc –453||  || Son of Corc mac Luigthig ||unknown|| 453
|-
| Óengus mac Nad Froích 453–489||  || Son of Nad Froích mac Cuirc ||Eithne Uathachpurported to have had twenty-four sons and twenty-four daughters|| 489
|-
| Feidlimid mac Óengusa 489–500||  || Son of Óengus mac Nad Froích ||unknown|| 500
|-
|}

Eóganacht Glendamnach, 500–596

|-
| Eochaid mac Óengusa 500–522||  || Son of Óengus mac Nad Froích||unknown|| 522
|-
| Crimthann Srem mac Echado 522–542||  || Son of Eochaid mac Óengusa||unknown|| 542
|-
| Coirpre Cromm mac Crimthainn 542–577||  || Son of Crimthann Srem mac Echado||unknown|| 577
|-
| Feidlimid mac Coirpri Chruimm 577–596(possible)||  || Son of Coirpre Cromm mac Crimthainn||unknown|| 596
|-
|}

Eóganacht Airthir Cliach, 577–582

|-
| Fergus Scandal mac Crimthainn 577–582||  || Son of Crimthann Srem mac Echado||unknown|| 582
|-
|}

Eóganacht Raithlind, 582–588

|-
| Feidlimid mac Tigernaig 582–588||  || Son of Tighearnach mac Aedh||unknown|| 588
|-
|}

Eóganacht Áine, 596–601

|-
| Amalgaid mac Éndai 596–601||  || Son of Éndai||unknown || 601
|-
| Garbán mac Éndai 596–601||  || Son of Éndai||unknown || 601
|-
|}

Eóganacht Chaisil, 601–618

|-
| Fíngen mac Áedo Duib 601–618||  || Son of Áedo Duib||Mór Mumanseveral children|| 618
|-
|}

Eóganacht Locha Léin, 618

|-
| Áed Bennán mac Crimthainn 618||  || Son of Crimthainn mac Cobhtach||unknown|| 618
|-
|}

Eóganacht Glendamnach, 618–627

|-
| Cathal mac Áedo 618–627||  || Son of Áed Fland Cathrach||Mór Mumanseveral children|| 627
|-
|}

Eóganacht Chaisil, 627–639

|-
| Faílbe Flann mac Áedo Duib 627–639||  || Son of Áedo Duib||unknown|| 639
|-
|}

Eóganacht Áine, 639–641

|-
| Cúán mac Amalgado 639–641||  || Son of Amalgaid mac Éndai||unknown || 641
|-
|}

Eóganacht Chaisil, 641–661

|-
| Máenach mac Fíngin 641–661||  || Son of Fíngen mac Áedo Duib and Mór Muman||unknown|| 661
|-
|}

Eóganacht Glendamnach, 661–665

|-
| Cathal Cú-cen-máthair 661–665||  || Son of Cathal mac Áedo||several children|| 665
|-
|}

Eóganacht Chaisil, 665–678

|-
| Colgú mac Faílbe Flaind 665–678||  || Son of Faílbe Flann mac Áedo Duib||unknown|| 678
|-
|}

Eóganacht Glendamnach, 678–701

|-
| Finguine mac Cathail 678–696||  || Son of Cathal Cú-cen-máthair||several children|| 696
|-
| Ailill mac Cathail 696–701||  || Son of Cathal Cú-cen-máthair||unknown|| 701
|}

Eóganacht Chaisil, 701–712

|-
| Cormac mac Ailello 701–712||  || Son of Ailello mac  Máenach||unknown|| 712
|-
|}

Eóganacht Áine, 712–721

|-
| Eterscél mac Máele Umai 712–721||  || Son of Máel Umai mac Cúán||unknown || 721
|-
|}

Eóganacht Glendamnach, 721–742

|-
| Cathal mac Finguine 721–742||  || Son of Finguine mac Cathail||several children|| 742
|-
|}

Eóganacht Áine, 742–769

|-
| Cathussach mac Eterscélai 742–769||  || Son of Eterscél mac Máele Umai||unknown || 769
|-
|}

Eóganacht Locha Léin, 769–786

|-
| Máel Dúin mac Áedo 769–786||  || Son of Áed Bennán mac Conaing ||unknown|| 786
|-
|}

Eóganacht Áine, 786–805

|-
| Ólchobar mac Duib-Indrecht 786–805||  || Son of Duib-Indrecht||unknown || 805
|-
|}

Eóganacht Glendamnach, 805–820

|-
| Artrí mac Cathail 805–820||  || Son of Cathal mac Finguine||one son|| 820
|-
| Tnúthgal mac Artrach –(possible)||  || Son of Artrí mac Cathail||unknown|| 807
|-
|}

Eóganacht Chaisil, 820–847

|-
| Tnúthgal mac Donngaile 807–820(possible)||  || Son of Máel Donngaile||unknown|| 820
|-
| Feidlimid mac Cremthanin 820–847||  || Son of Crimthainn||unknown|| 28 August 847
|-
|}

Eóganacht Áine, 847–851

|-
| Ólchobar mac Cináeda 847–851||  || Son of Cináeda ||unknown || 851
|-
|}

Eóganacht Chaisil, 851–859

|-
| Áilgenán mac Donngaile 851–853||  || Son of Donngaile||unknown|| 853
|-
| Máel Gualae mac Donngaile 853–859||  || Son of Donngaile||one son|| 859
|-
|}

Eóganacht Áine, 859–872

|-
| Cenn Fáelad hua Mugthigirn 859–872||  || Son of Mugthigirn ||unknown || 872
|-
|}

Eóganacht Chaisil, 872–908

|-
| Dúnchad mac Duib-dá-Bairenn 872–888||  || Son of Duib-dá-Bairenn mac Crundmáel||unknown|| 888
|-
| Dub Lachtna mac Máele Gualae 888–895||  || Son of Máel Gualae mac Donngaile||unknown|| 895
|-
| Finguine Cenn nGécan mac Loégairi 895–902||  || Son of Loégairi mac Duib-dá-Bairenn||unknown|| 902
|-
| Cormac mac Cuilennáin 902–908||  || Son of Cuilennáin mac Selbach||unknown|| 908
|-
|}

Múscraige, 908–944

|-
| Flaithbertach mac Inmainén 908–944||   || Son of Inmainén||unknown || 944
|-
|}

Eóganacht Chaisil, 944–957

|-
| Lorcán mac Coinlígáin 944–||  || Son of Coinlígáin mac Corcrán||unknown|| unknown
|-
| Cellachán Caisil –954||  || Son of Buadacháin mac Lachtnae||one son|| 954
|-
| Máel Fathardaig mac Flann 954–957||  || Son of Flann mac Donnchad||one son|| 957
|-
|}

Eóganacht Raithlind, 957–959

|-
| Dub-dá-Bairenn mac Domnaill 957–959||   || Son of Domnall mac Dub-dá-Bairenn||unknown || 959
|-
|}

Eóganacht Chaisil, 959–963

|-
| Fer Gráid mac Clérig 959–961||  || Son of Clérig mac Áilgenán||unknown|| 961
|-
| Donnchad mac Cellacháin 959–963||  || Son of Cellachán Caisil||unknown|| 963
|-
|}

Eóganacht Raithlind, 959–978

|-
| Máel Muad mac Brain 959–970976–978||  || Son of Brian||one son || 978
|-
|}

Uí Ímair, 960–977

|-
| Ivar of Limerick 960–977(de facto)||  ||uncertain||several children || 977
|-
|}

Dál gCais, 970–1014

|-
| Mathgamain mac Cennétig 970–976||  || Son of Cennétig mac Lorcáin ||unknown || 976
|-
| Brian Bóruma mac Cennétig978–1014 ||  || c. 941 Son of Cennétig mac Lorcáin and Bé Binn inion Urchadh || (1) Mór three sons(2) Echradone son(3) Gormflaithone son || 23 April 1014
|-
|}

Eóganacht Chaisil, 1014–1025

|-
| Dúngal Hua Donnchada 1014–1025||  || Son of Máel Fathardaig mac Flann||unknown|| 1025
|-
|}

Ó Briain, 1025–1119

|-
| Donnchad mac Briain 1025–1064||  || Son of Brian Bóruma and Gormflaith ingen Murchada ||Cacht ingen RagnaillThree children || 1064
|-
| Murchad mac Donnchada 1064–1068||  || Son of Donnchad mac Briain and  Cacht ingen Ragnaill||unknown || 1068
|-
| Toirdhealbhach Ua Briain 1068–1086||  ||1009 Son of Tadc mac Briain and Mór||(1) DubchoblaigOne son(2) DerbforgaillTwo sons|| 1086
|-
| Muircheartach Ua Briain 1086–1114 1118–1119||  ||1050 Son of Toirdhealbhach Ua Briain||Derb Forgaill ingen Uí LaidcnénThree children|| 1119
|-
| Diarmait Ua Briain 1114–1118||  || 1060 Son of Toirdhealbhach Ua Briain||unknown || 1118
|-
| Brian Ua Briain 1118||  || Son of Murchad mac Donnchada||unknown || 1118
|-
|}

Mac Cárthaigh, 1127–1138

|-
| Cormac Mac Carthaigh 1127–1138||  || Son of Muireadach Mac Carthaigh||unknown|| 1138
|-
|}

Ó Briain, 1138–1194

|-
| Conchobar Ua Briain 1138–1142(claimant) ||  || Son of Diarmait Ua Briain ||unknown || 1142
|-
| Toirdhealbhach mac Diarmada Ua Briain 1142–1167(claimant) ||  || Son of Diarmait Ua Briain ||unknown || 1167
|-
| Muirchertach mac Toirdelbhach Ua Briain 1167–1168(claimant) ||  || Son of Toirdelbhach mac Diarmaida Ua Briain ||unknown || 1168
|-
| Domnall Mór Ua Briain 1168–1194(claimant) ||  || Son of Toirdelbhach mac Diarmaida Ua Briain ||Orlacan Ní MurchadaFour children|| 1194
|-
|}

See also
 List of High Kings of Ireland
 List of kings of Ulster
 List of kings of Leinster
 List of kings of Connacht
 List of kings of Mide
 List of kings of Desmond
 List of kings of Thomond

Notes

References
Bryne, Francis J. Irish Kings and High Kings. New York: St. Martin's Press, 1973.
Charles-Edwards, T.M. Early Christian Ireland. Cambridge: Cambridge University Press, 2000.  
Moody, T.W.; F.J. Byrne and F.X. Martin, ed. A New History of Ireland. Vol. IX. New York: Oxford University Press, 1982. 
Áed Ua Crimthainn, Book of Leinster, c. 1160.
The Laud Synchronisms. K. Meyer, 1913.

External links

MacCarthy Clan Foundation at McCarthyClan.org
 O'Brien Clan Foundation at OBrienClan.com
 The McGillycuddy of the Reeks at McGillycuddy.co.za
O'Mahony Society at OMahonySociety.com
O'Donoghue Society at ODonoghue.co.uk

 
Munster
O'Brien dynasty
Munster